Makarovka is a rural locality (a village) in Kovarditskoye Rural Settlement, Muromsky District, Vladimir Oblast, Russia. The population was 424 as of 2010. There are 4 streets.

Geography 
Makarovka is located on the Pogartsy River, 9 km west of Murom (the district's administrative centre) by road. Aleksandrovka is the nearest rural locality.

References 

Rural localities in Muromsky District
Muromsky Uyezd